James Power ( – June 21, 1847 in Carbonear, Newfoundland) was a merchant, politician, justice of the peace and magistrate was elected to the House of Assembly representing the district of Conception Bay on the first general election held in Newfoundland in 1832.

See also
 List of people of Newfoundland and Labrador

References

1847 deaths
Members of the Newfoundland and Labrador House of Assembly
People from Carbonear
Year of birth uncertain
Newfoundland Colony judges
1796 births